Potato Hill is a summit located in Central New York Region of New York located in the Town of Boonville in Oneida County, southeast of Boonville.

References

Mountains of Oneida County, New York
Mountains of New York (state)